IIL may stand for

Indian Independence League
Integrated injection logic
The Insurance Institute of London
The Institut International de Lancy
 II-L or IIL, a subtype of Type II supernova